Robert Tarlton was a farmer and state legislator in South Carolina. He represented Colleton County in the South Carolina House of Representatives from 1870 to 1874 during the Reconstruction era. He was born in South Carolina and documented as being "mulatto".

See also
African-American officeholders during and following the Reconstruction era

References

Members of the South Carolina House of Representatives
19th-century American politicians
African-American politicians during the Reconstruction Era
African-American state legislators in South Carolina
Farmers from South Carolina
People from Colleton County, South Carolina
African-American farmers
Year of birth missing
Year of death missing